{{Automatic taxobox
| fossil_range =  
| image =
| image_caption = Holotype of Tirnovella alpillensis, known by the synonym, Berriasella alpillensis| taxon = Tirnovella
| authority = Nikolov, 1966
| type_species = Tirnovella alpillensis| type_species_authority = Mazenot, 1939
| subdivision_ranks = Species
| subdivision = See text
| subdivision_ref = 
}}Tirnovella is an extinct subgenus of ammonoid cephalopod, from the early Cretaceous. 

Use in Stratigraphy

The group is often used as an index fossil, with Tirnovella alpillensis being used to define border between the  Berriasian and the Valanginian stages of the Cretaceous, and Tirnovella subalpina defining the border between the Middle and Lower substages of the Berriasian.  The Middle Berriasian is the defined as the Tirnovella occitanica'' zone.

Distribution
Fossils of the genus are relatively common throughout Europe, with fossils from Morocco to Crimea.

Species

References

Perisphinctoidea
Ammonitida genera